Minipreço is a discount supermarket chain in Portugal, part of the Spanish Dia, which was formerly owned by the French supermarket company Carrefour. There were 534 stores across Portugal at the start of 2011, with one third of them being franchises. According to the Associação Portuguesa de Empresas de Distribuição (Portuguese Association of Distribution Companies), Minipreço had more stores in Portugal in 2010 than any other brand, ahead of Pingo Doce and Lidl. By the end of 2014 the number of Minipreço supermarkets had risen to 641, with 289 of them being franchises.

It was formerly known as Companhia Nacional de Descontos. Minipreço was first owned by Companhia Portuguesa de Hipermercados (now known as Auchan Retail Portugal) but later sold to Distribuidora Internacional de Alimentación, S.A. (DIA) of Spain. The chain had annual sales of over €900 million in 2009 and 2010. In July 2011, Carrefour spun off Dia, listing the company on the Madrid stock exchange.

See also
 List of supermarket chains in Portugal

References

External links

Supermarkets of Portugal
Discount stores